Chmury nie było is the second studio album by the Polish experimental metal band Kobong. Most of the album was recorded between January and February 1997 in studio D-7 in Wisła, while the acoustic versions of "Przeciwko" and "Prbda" were recorded live in the studio  in November 1996.

Track listing

Personnel
 Bogdan Kondracki - bass, vocals
 Robert Sadowski - guitar
 Wojciech Szymański - drums
 Maciej Miechowicz - guitar

References

1997 albums
Kobong (band) albums